= List of gelechiid genera =

The large moth family Gelechiidae contains the following genera:
